Neža Černe (born 1933) is a Slovenian gymnast. She competed in the women's artistic team all-around at the 1948 Summer Olympics.

References

1933 births
Living people
Slovenian female artistic gymnasts
Olympic gymnasts of Yugoslavia
Gymnasts at the 1948 Summer Olympics
Sportspeople from Maribor